is a Japanese manga series written and illustrated by Shohei Manabe. It has been serialized in Shogakukan's seinen manga magazine Weekly Big Comic Spirits since October 2020.

Publication
Written and illustrated by Shohei Manabe, Kujō no Taizai started in Shogakukan's seinen manga magazine Weekly Big Comic Spirits on October 12, 2020. Shogakukan has collected its chapters into individual tankōbon volumes. The first volume was released on February 26, 2021. As of July 29, 2022, six volumes have been released.

Volume list

Reception
The series ranked 10th on the Nationwide Bookstore Employees' Recommended Comics of 2022.

References

Further reading

External links
  

Seinen manga
Shogakukan manga